The Canal de la Bruche is a canal in eastern France that originally connected Soultz-les-Bains, near Molsheim, to the city of Strasbourg. It was built in 1682 by the famous military engineer Vauban, principally to transport sandstone from the quarries of Soultz for use in the construction of the fortifications of Strasbourg. The last commercial load was carried in 1939 and the canal formally closed in 1957, after bridges damaged during World War II  were rebuilt with insufficient headroom for navigation.

It roughly parallels the river Bruche (river), taking its water supply from the confluence of the Bruche and Mossig rivers at Wolxheim, with a secondary supply downriver at Kolbsheim. When the canal was built, the Ill provided navigable connections to the city and the Rhine, and in later years to the Canal du Rhone au Rhine and the Canal de la Marne au Rhin.

Although no longer navigable, the canal is retained in water, and is now managed by the Conseil Départemental du Bas-Rhin.

Gallery

See also
 List of canals in France

References

Bruche
Canals opened in 1682
1682 establishments in France